Tiago Fernando Penela Silva (born 28 March 2000) is a Portuguese professional footballer who plays for Trofense as a goalkeeper.

Club career
Born in Seixal, Silva spent most of his youth career in the ranks of S.L. Benfica B, and concluded his development at Vitória SC. He signed a contract with the latter in October 2018, when he was named in their new under-23 team. On 18 May 2019 he made his debut for the already relegated reserve team on the final day of the LigaPro season, in a 2–2 draw at home to FC Porto B.

References

External links

2000 births
People from Seixal
Sportspeople from Setúbal District
Living people
Portuguese footballers
Association football goalkeepers
S.L. Benfica footballers
C.F. Os Belenenses players
C.D. Aves players
Vitória S.C. players
Vitória S.C. B players
Leixões S.C. players
C.D. Trofense players
Liga Portugal 2 players
Campeonato de Portugal (league) players